The Sorrow of Telemachus is a 1783 oil painting by Angelica Kauffman. It is in the collection of the Metropolitan Museum of Art.

Early history and creation
This painting and Telemachus and the Nymphs of Calypso were painted for Monsignor .  They show scenes from the French novel The Adventures of Telemachus published by François Fénelon in 1699, and based on the story of Telemachus, son of Odysseus.

Description and interpretation
Telemachus was shipwrecked off Calypso's island, and in this image she tells her nymphs to stop singing Odysseus's praises because of his son's grief.

Other versions

References
 

Metropolitan Museum of Art 2017 drafts
Paintings in the collection of the Metropolitan Museum of Art
1783 paintings
Paintings depicting Greek myths
Paintings by Angelica Kauffman
Paintings based on the Odyssey
Works based on Les Aventures de Télémaque